Annie discography may refer to:

 Annie (singer) discography
 Annie (musical) discography; see Annie (musical)#Recordings

See also
 Annie (1982 film soundtrack)
 Annie (1999 film soundtrack)
 "Annie" (song)
 Annie (disambiguation)